Posey is a census-designated place in Tulare County, California, United States. Posey has a post office with ZIP code 93260, which opened in 1915. The population was 10 at the 2010 census. The elevation of Posey is 3573 feet.

Geography
According to the United States Census Bureau, the CDP covers an area of 0.4 square miles (0.9 km), all of it land. In the past, the area near Posey had numerous Tungsten mines.

Climate
According to the Köppen Climate Classification system, Posey has a semi-arid climate, abbreviated "BSk" on climate maps.

Demographics
At the 2010 census Posey had a population of 10. The racial makeup of Posey was 6 (60.0%) White, 0 (0.0%) African American, 3 (30.0%) Native American, 0 (0.0%) Asian, 0 (0.0%) Pacific Islander, 0 (0.0%) from other races, and 1 (10.0%) from two or more races. Hispanic or Latino of any race were 3 people (30.0%).

The whole population lived in households, no one lived in non-institutionalized group quarters and no one was institutionalized.

There were 5 households, 0 (0%) had children under the age of 18 living in them, 2 (40.0%) were opposite-sex married couples living together, 1 (20.0%) had a female householder with no husband present, 0 (0%) had a male householder with no wife present.  There were 1 (20.0%) unmarried opposite-sex partnerships, and 0 (0%) same-sex married couples or partnerships. 0 households (0%) were one person and 0 (0%) had someone living alone who was 65 or older. The average household size was 2.00.  There were 3 families (60.0% of households); the average family size was 2.00.

The age distribution was 0 people (0%) under the age of 18, 0 people (0%) aged 18 to 24, 2 people (20.0%) aged 25 to 44, 5 people (50.0%) aged 45 to 64, and 3 people (30.0%) who were 65 or older.  The median age was 52.0 years. For every 100 females, there were 66.7 males.  For every 100 females age 18 and over, there were 66.7 males.

There were 15 housing units at an average density of 42.0 per square mile, of the occupied units 4 (80.0%) were owner-occupied and 1 (20.0%) were rented. The homeowner vacancy rate was 0%; the rental vacancy rate was 0%.  8 people (80.0% of the population) lived in owner-occupied housing units and 2 people (20.0%) lived in rental housing units.

References

Census-designated places in Tulare County, California
Census-designated places in California